DVA, dva or D.VA may refer to:

Finance
 Debit Valuation Adjustment, one of the X-Value Adjustments in relation to derivative instruments held by banks
 Debt valuation adjustment, valuation on corporation's publicly traded debt impacts corporation's earnings
 Dollar Value Averaging, a technique of adding to an investment portfolio

Music
 Clock DVA, an industrial, post-punk and EBM group
 DVA (band) (stylised form: DVA) a Czech musical duo
 DVA Music, a record label
 DVAS, an electronic dance music group
 Dva (album) (stylised form: DVA), a 2013 music album by electronic artist Emika
 Scratcha DVA, an electronic musician, producer and DJ

Other uses
 Defence Vetting Agency, former name of DBS National Security Vetting, a unit in the Defence Business Services of the U.K.
 Developmental venous anomaly, a congenital variant of the cerebral venous drainage
 Driver and Vehicle Agency of Northern Ireland, UK
 D.Va, a character in the first-person shooter game Overwatch
Digital variance angiography, an image processing method used in medical imaging.

See also
 Department of Veterans Affairs